Wikitude is a mobile augmented reality (AR) technology provider based in Salzburg, Austria. Founded in 2008, Wikitude initially focused on providing location-based augmented reality experiences through the Wikitude World Browser App. In 2012, the company restructured it's proposition by launching the Wikitude SDK, a development framework utilizing image recognition and tracking, and geolocation technologies.

In September 2021 Wikitude announced that it has been acquired by Qualcomm.

The Wikitude SDK is the company's core product. First launched in October 2008, the SDK includes image recognition & tracking, 3D model rendering, video overlay, location based AR. In 2017 Wikitude launched its SLAM technology (Simultaneous Localization And Mapping) which enables object recognition and tracking, as well as markerless instant tracking.

The cross platform SDK is available for Android, iOS and Windows operating systems, being optimized as well for several smart eyewear devices.

The Wikitude app was the first publicly available application that used a location-based approach to augmented reality.

How it works

Location based augmented reality 
Wikitude initially entered the market with its geo location AR app. The Wikitude app was the first publicly available application that used a location-based approach to augmented reality.

For location-based augmented reality, the position of objects on the screen of the mobile device is calculated using the user's position (by GPS or Wi-Fi), the direction in which the user is facing (by using the compass) and accelerometer. Augmentations can be placed at specific points of interest and afterwards viewed through the devices' screen or lenses.

One of the best known examples of Geo based AR is Pokémon Go.

Image Recognition 
Since August 2012, Wikitude also features image recognition technologies that allow for tracker images to trigger augmented reality technology within the app.

The software identifies relevant feature points of the target image (also known as marker). This allows to overlay and stick augmentations in specific position on top or around the image.

SLAM: Instant Tracking, Object and Scene Recognition 
In 2017 Wikitude launched its SLAM technology. Instant Tracking, the first feature using SLAM, allows developers to easily map environments and display augmented reality content without the need for target images (markers). Object Recognition is the latest addition based on SLAM, with the launch of SDK 7. The idea behind Object Recognition and Tracking is very similar to Image Tracking, but instead of recognizing images and planar surfaces, the Object Tracker can work with three-dimensional structures and objects (tools, toys, machinery…).

Discussion 
Opinions differ as to whether the location-based approach of augmented reality implemented by Wikitude can be considered as augmented reality. There is also concern for the accuracy of the GPS, compass and motion sensors used to calculate the position of the virtual objects. Inaccuracies could accumulate to the point that they prevent delivering a feasible result. In practice, this technique proves to be much simpler to implement than ones using the marker-based approach. In a current listing of the Top 5 AR Apps from The Telegraph, three mobile applications use the location-based approach (Google Goggles used both approaches).

Awards 
 2017:
 Best Developer Tool 2017, Augmented World Expo
 2015:
 Honorable Mentions for Best Tool 2015, Augmented World Expo
 2012:
 Best Augmented Reality Browser, Augmented Planet
 Best Augmented Reality Developer Tool, Augmented Planet
Android Apps Magazine – Best Augmented Reality app 2013
 2011: 
 Best Augmented Reality Browser, Augmented Planet
 Best Augmented Reality Developer Tool, Augmented Planet
 Best BBM Connected Application, BlackBerry® EMEA Innovation Award
 Most Addictive Social App using BBM Social Platform, 2011 BlackBerry Developer Challenge
 2010: 
 Best Augmented Reality Browser, Augmented Planet;
 World Summit Award
 Galileo Master 2010 at European Satellite Navigation Competition
 Global Champion at Navteq Challenge 2010
 Hagenberg Award
 Grand Prize Winner Navteq Challenge 2010 (EMEA Region)
 2009:
 Best Augmented Reality Browser, Augmented Planet
 GSMA Mobile Innovation 2009 Global Competition EMEA "Top Innovator"
 Salzburger Wirtschaftspreis
 2008:
 Android Developer Challenge Top-50 Award

References

External links 

 
 The Telegraph (2009): Augmented reality: a technology whose time has come
 The Economist (2009): Reality, improved
 The New York Times (2009): Augmented Reality Browser War Heats Up With Wikitude's Latest Version
 Wall Street Journal (2009): The Best Android Apps of 2009
 The Economist (2010): A special report on smart systems - Augmented business
 The New York Times (2011): BlackBerry Brings Augmented Reality Mainstream, Preloads Wikitude On New Phones
 CNN Tavel (2011): 10 top augmented reality travel apps

Augmented reality
Augmented reality applications